Péter Pázmándy (7 June 1938 – 23 March 2012) was a Hungarian football player and coach, active primarily in Switzerland.

Career
Pázmándy, a defender, played for Swiss club Servette between 1957 and 1968, winning two league titles.

After retiring as a player, Pazmandy worked as a coach and manager for a number of Swiss clubs.

References

1938 births
2012 deaths
Hungarian footballers
Servette FC players
Hungarian football managers
Servette FC managers
FC Lausanne-Sport managers
AC Bellinzona managers
FC Sion managers
CS Chênois players
Association football defenders
Footballers from Budapest